Bek-Abad is a village in Suzak District, Jalal-Abad Region, Kyrgyzstan. Its population was 11,476 in 2021.

Population

References

Populated places in Jalal-Abad Region